Bamanhat railway station serves the town of Bamanhat lying in Alipurduar–Bamanhat branch line, Cooch Behar district in the Indian state of West Bengal. The station lies under Alipurduar railway division of Northeast Frontier Railway zone.

Trains

Major Trains
Sealdah-Bamanhat Uttar Banga Express
Siliguri Bamanhat Intercity Express.
Apart from these major trains, some local and DEMU trains too originates from Bamanhat and connects different parts of North Bengal.

History

Before partition of India in 1947, there was a rail link to Lalmonirhat Junction, now in Bangladesh, through Geetaldaha and Mogalhat. Even in 1955 the line was there when there were talks between India and Pakistan for resumption of rail links.
It was then known as the Assam Line Railway Service. The links were disturbed with bridges being washed away. The entire area had metre-gauge tracks.
Northeast Frontier Railway converted the Alipurduar–Bamanhat branch line to  broad gauge in 2007. The Alipuduar-Bamanhat branch line up to Geetaldaha was earlier part of Cooch Behar State Railway. The Geetaldaha-Bamanhat sector was part of what was called the Assam Line Railway Service.

Prior to the partition of India, the prestigious Assam Mail used to travel from Santahar to Guwahati.

The map alongside presents the position as it stands today (2020). The international border was not there when the railways were first laid in the area in the 19th-20th century. It came up in 1947. Since then, it has been an effort to live up to the new realities. The map is 'Interactive' (the larger version) – it means that all the places shown in the map are linked in the full screen map.

Station
It is located near the India–Bangladesh border and handles around 15,000 passengers daily.

References

External links
Trains at Bamanhat

Alipurduar railway division
Railway stations in Cooch Behar district